Kamilya Dosmalova (born 11 August 1992) is a Kazakhstani parataekwondo practitioner. She will compete at the 2020 Summer Paralympics in the –58 kg category.

Results
https://olympics.com/tokyo-2020/paralympic-games/en/results/taekwondo/athlete-profile-n1717075-dosmalova-kamilya.htm

World Championships

5	Women K44 -58kg	2019	Antalya, TUR

European Championships

5	Women K44 -58kg	2016	Warsaw, POL

References

External links
 

1992 births
Living people
Kazakhstani female taekwondo practitioners
Taekwondo practitioners at the 2020 Summer Paralympics
People from Kyzylorda
21st-century Kazakhstani women